is a Japanese olympic wrestler and mixed martial artist, who won the silver medal in 63–69 kg Greco-Roman wrestling at the 2000 Summer Olympics.

He is also the brother of professional wrestler Yuji Nagata, who works for New Japan Pro-Wrestling (NJPW).

Awards
Tokyo Sports
Wrestling Special Award (2000)

Mixed martial arts record

|-
| Draw
| align=center| 6–7–3
| Koji Oishi
| Draw (unanimous)
| Pancrase: Impressive Tour 13
| 
| align=center| 3
| align=center| 5:00
| Tokyo, Japan
| 
|-
| Draw
| align=center| 6–7–2
| Koji Oishi
| Draw (decision)
| Pancrase: Passion Tour 11 
| 
| align=center| 2
| align=center| 5:00
| Tokyo, Japan
| 
|-
| Loss
| align=center| 6–7–1
| Katsuya Inoue
| Decision (unanimous)
| GCM - Cage Force 17
| 
| align=center| 3
| align=center| 5:00
| Tokyo, Japan
| 
|-
| Win
| align=center| 6–6–1
| Koji Anjo
| Decision (majority)
| GCM - Cage Force 15
| 
| align=center| 3
| align=center| 5:00
| Tokyo, Japan
| 
|-
| Win
| align=center| 5–6–1
| Daisuke Hoshino
| Decision (unanimous)
| GCM - Cage Force 13
| 
| align=center| 3
| align=center| 5:00
| Tokyo, Japan
| 
|-
| Loss
| align=center| 4–6–1
| Kuniyoshi Hironaka
| TKO (punches)
| GCM - Cage Force 11
| 
| align=center| 1
| align=center| 3:41
| Tokyo, Japan
| 
|-
| Loss
| align=center| 4–5–1
| Vítor Ribeiro
| TKO (cut)
| DREAM 8
| 
| align=center| 1
| align=center| 7:58
| Nagoya, Japan
| 
|-
| Draw
| align=center| 4–4–1
| Yasunori Kanehara
| Draw
| GCM - Cage Force EX
| 
| align=center| 3
| align=center| 5:00
| Tokorozawa, Japan
| 
|-
| Loss
| align=center| 4–4
| Naoyuki Kotani
| Submission (heel hook)
| ZST - ZST.18: Sixth Anniversary
| 
| align=center| 2
| align=center| 4:38
| Tokyo, Japan
| 
|-
| Loss
| align=center| 4–3
| Shinya Aoki
| Submission (mounted gogoplata)
| Dream 4: Middleweight Grand Prix 2008 Second Round
| 
| align=center| 1
| align=center| 5:12
| Yokohama, Japan
| 
|-
| Win
| align=center| 4–2
| Artur Oumakhanov
| Decision (unanimous)
| Dream 1: Lightweight Grand Prix 2008 First Round
| 
| align=center| 2
| align=center| 5:00
| Saitama, Japan
| 
|-
| Loss
| align=center| 3–2
| Caol Uno
| Decision (unanimous)
| Hero's 9
| 
| align=center| 3
| align=center| 5:00
| Yokohama, Japan
| Hero's 2007 Lightweight Grand Prix quarter-final.
|-
| Win
| align=center| 3–1
| Isaiah Hill
| Decision (split)
| Dynamite!! USA
| 
| align=center| 3
| align=center| 5:00
| Los Angeles, California, United States
| 
|-
| Win
| align=center| 2–1
| Shuichiro Katsumura
| TKO (punches)
| K-1 - Premium 2006 Dynamite!!
| 
| align=center| 1
| align=center| 4:12
| Osaka, Japan
| 
|-
| Loss
| align=center| 1–1
| Yoshihiro Akiyama
| KO (spinning back kick)
| Hero's 5
| 
| align=center| 2
| align=center| 2:25
| Tokyo, Japan
| 
|-
| Win
| align=center| 1–0
| Remigijus Morkevicius
| Decision (unanimous)
| K-1 - Premium 2005 Dynamite!!
| 
| align=center| 2
| align=center| 5:00
| Osaka, Japan
|

References

External links
 Official website
 K-1 data
 

Living people
1973 births
People from Tōgane
Japanese male mixed martial artists
Lightweight mixed martial artists
Mixed martial artists utilizing Greco-Roman wrestling
Japanese male professional wrestlers
Wrestlers at the 2000 Summer Olympics
Wrestlers at the 2004 Summer Olympics
Japanese male sport wrestlers
Olympic silver medalists for Japan
Olympic wrestlers of Japan
Nippon Sport Science University alumni
Sportspeople from Chiba Prefecture
Olympic medalists in wrestling
Wrestlers at the 2002 Asian Games
Wrestlers at the 1998 Asian Games
Medalists at the 2000 Summer Olympics
Asian Games competitors for Japan